Shock and Awe: The Story of Electricity is a British television series outlining aspects of the history of electricity. The series was a co-production between the Open University and the BBC and aired from 6 to 20 October 2011 on BBC Four. The programs were presented by Jim Al-Khalili.

Episodes 
 Spark: How pioneers unlocked electricity's mysteries and built strange instruments to create it.
 The Age of Invention: How harnessing the link between magnetism and electricity transformed the world.
 Revelations and Revolutions: After centuries of experimentation, how we finally came to understand electromagnetism.

Spark 
In the first episode Al-Khalili introduces the history of our understanding of electricity and the harnessing of its power. He covers the achievements of these "natural philosophers" – Francis Hauksbee, Stephen Gray, Musschenbroek, Benjamin Franklin, Henry Cavendish, Galvani, Volta and Humphry Davy.

The programme starts with Hauksbee's invention of a static-electricity generator and its subsequent demonstration to the high-minded. It covers Franklin and the resulting experiments to capture and tame lightning. The narrative continues with Cavendish's investigations of the electric shock received from the torpedo fish. Al-Khalili expands on the development of the electric battery following Volta's discovery that simultaneously licking a copper coin and a silver spoon would generate a tingle of electricity. The programme finishes with the first breakthrough in finding a commercial use for electricity: Humphry Davy demonstrating the first carbon-arc light before members of the Royal Institution.

The Age of Invention 
In the second episode Al-Khalili covers the scientists who discovered the links between electricity and magnetism leading to a way to generate electric power- Hans Christian Oersted, Michael Faraday, William Sturgeon and Joseph Henry.

The development of commercial applications started with Samuel Morse and Al-Khalili then tells the story of the 1866 transatlantic cable. He revisits the war of the currents rivalry between direct current and alternating current.

Revelations and Revolutions 
In the final episode Al-Khalili brings the story up to date covering the achievements of James Clerk Maxwell; Heinrich Hertz; Oliver Lodge; Jagadish Bose; William Crookes; Mataré & Welker; and William Shockley.

See also 
History of electromagnetic theory
History of electrical engineering
History of electric power transmission

References

External links 
 
 BBC information
 

2011 British television series debuts
2011 British television series endings
BBC high definition shows
BBC television documentaries about history
BBC television documentaries about science
British documentary films
British documentary television series
Documentary films about the history of science
Historical television series
History of electrical engineering
English-language television shows
History of energy